The Black Mallard River, also known as Carp Creek, is a short river in the Lower Peninsula of the U.S. state of Michigan.

The Black Mallard rises in Bearinger Township in northwest Presque Isle County and flows mostly east and south into Black Mallard Lake about a mile inland from Lake Huron.  Its entire length lies within Bearinger Township. 100% of the frontage is privately owned. Depth varies from 6 inches to 6 feet. Width varies from 12 to 22 feet. Numerous tree falls and beaver dams.

The Black Mallard River also hosts nice rainbow trout, and smallmouth bass fishing and a large number of rock bass as well.

References 

Rivers of Presque Isle County, Michigan
Rivers of Michigan
Tributaries of Lake Huron